Compassion (also released as Foggy Day) is an album by pianist Hank Jones recorded in France in 1978 for the Black & Blue label.

Reception

Allmusic awarded the album 4 stars, stating: "It's hard to imagine any of these three superb musicians being in anything other than top form, and they do not disappoint."

Track listing
 "A Foggy Day" (George Gershwin, Ira Gershwin) – 5:28
 "Angel Face" (Hank Jones) – 6:30
 "Allan's Allies" (Alan Dawson) – 3:53
 "Hank's Blues" (Jones) – 6:01
 "Yours Is My Heart Alone" (Franz Lehár) – 6:31
 "Compassion" (Milt Hinton) – 8:20
 "Come to Me" (Milt Jackson) – 6:26
 "A Foggy Day" [Take 1] (Gershwin, Gershwin) – 4:57 Bonus track on CD reissue
 "Yours Is My Heart Alone" [Take 2] (Lehár) – 6:26 Bonus track on CD reissue
 "Come to Me" [Take 1] (Jackson) – 8:26 Bonus track on CD reissue
 "Alan's Allies" [Take 1] (Dawson) – 4:09 Bonus track on CD reissue

Personnel 
Hank Jones – piano
George Duvivier – bass
Alan Dawson – drums

References 

1978 albums
Hank Jones albums
Black & Blue Records albums